"The Ride" is a song recorded by American country singer-songwriter David Allan Coe. It was released in February 1983 as the lead single from the album, Castles in the Sand. The song spent 19 weeks on the Billboard country singles charts, reaching a peak of number four and peaked at number two on the Canadian RPM Country Tracks chart.

Background and writing
Writer Gary Gentry told Billboard magazine, "there's a mysterious magic connected with this song that spells cold chills, leading me to believe that it was meant to be and that David Allan Coe was meant to record it." He goes on to say that when he was looking up the date of Williams' death in his autobiography, he opened the book to the exact page. Later, when he was performing the song at the Opry House for a television show, the lights and power in the Opryland complex went out when performing the last verse when it says, 'Hank'.

Content
The ballad tells the first-person story of a hitchhiker's encounter with the ghost of Hank Williams, Sr. in a ride from Montgomery, Alabama to Nashville, Tennessee. The mysterious driver, "dressed like 1950, half drunk and hollow-eyed" and driving an "antique Cadillac" (referring to the baby blue 1952 Cadillac convertible that Williams died in), questions the narrator whether he has the musical talent and dedication to become a star in the country music industry. The song's lyrics place the events on U.S. Route 31 or the largely parallel Interstate 65.

History
The song first appeared on Coe's Castles in the Sand album. It was first covered by Hank Williams, Jr. and later by Tim McGraw (appearing at the end of the "Real Good Man" music video, which was recorded live).

Alternate version
An alternate 1983 studio version exists that is still heard occasionally on country radio and Sirius XM.  Where the album version leaves off after the final verse, the alternate cut contains the additional lyrics performed in spoken word:

Chart performance

References

1983 singles
David Allan Coe songs
Song recordings produced by Billy Sherrill
Songs written by Gary Gentry (songwriter)
1983 songs
Columbia Records singles
Songs about Hank Williams